The Albatros L 76 Aeolus was a military reconnaissance aircraft built by Albatros Flugzeugwerke in 1927. The plane had wooden dual-spar wings with plywood skins supported by N-type struts and a fabric-covered fuselage made of welded steel tubing. The aircraft was used for testing, as well as the training of the Soviet Air Force. It was difficult to fly, and killed many people, including Emil Thuy, who crashed near Smolensk on June 11, 1930, and Paul Jeschonnek, who crashed near Berlin on June 13, 1929. As a result, it had to be improved, leading to the production of the Albatros L 77v, designed by  Ernst Heinkel Flugzeugwerke.

Operators

Soviet Air Force - Two aircraft, used for tests and trials.

Specifications

Notes

References
Michael J. H. Taylor, Jane's Encyclopedia of Aviation. Studio Editions, London (1989).
W.Green & G Swanborough, The Complete Book of Fighters. Salamander Books, London (1994). 

1920s German military reconnaissance aircraft
L 076
Single-engined tractor aircraft
Aircraft first flown in 1927
Sesquiplanes